The 1992 Princeton Tigers football team was an American football team that represented Princeton University during the 1992 NCAA Division I-AA football season. Princeton was co-champion of the Ivy League.

In their sixth year under head coach Steve Tosches, the Tigers compiled an 8–2 record and outscored opponents 264 to 175. Aaron Harris was the team captain.

Princeton's 6–1 conference record tied atop the Ivy League standings. The Tigers outscored Ivy League opponents 181 to 102. Princeton's only conference loss was the season-ending showdown with co-champion Dartmouth.

By the closing weeks of the season, Princeton had cracked the national top 20 rankings, listed as No. 20 in the poll of November 9 and No. 17 in the poll of November 16. Following the loss to Dartmouth, Princeton was unranked in the season's final poll.

Princeton played its home games at Palmer Stadium on the university campus in Princeton, New Jersey.

Schedule

References

Princeton
Princeton Tigers football seasons
Ivy League football champion seasons
Princeton Tigers football